Fausto Zevi is a contemporary Italian classical archaeologist.

Presently he is professor of Archaeology and Greco-Roman art history at the University of Rome La Sapienza and has previously held posts at the University of Naples Federico II and as archaeological superintendent at Ostia, Naples, and Rome.  He is a prolific scholar with more than 200 publications on archaic Rome, Roman hellenism, the topography and urban plan of Pompeii, Ostia, and Rome.  He is a member of the Accademia Nazionale dei Lincei, the German Archaeological Institute, and an honorary fellow of the British School at Rome.

Zevi was a student of Ranuccio Bianchi Bandinelli.

References

Italian archaeologists
Year of birth missing (living people)
Living people
Academic staff of the Sapienza University of Rome

Sean Griffiths was the best excavator back in 1810.